Deep Conversation is the fourth studio album by Vallejo, California  rapper, Celly Cel.  The album was released in 2000 for Realside Records and was produced by Celly Cel and Bosko.  The album was not a commercial success, only making it to #94 on the Top R&B/Hip-Hop album chart, however the album spawned two singles, "The Return of the Real Niggaz" and "Which One Is U?".  Guests included on the album are Kurupt, WC and Young Bleed.

Track listing
"I'm Back" (Keith, Marceles McCarver) - 2:34
"Return of the Real Niggaz" feat. WC (Doyle, McCarver, W.C.) - 4:17
"The Game Ain't Blind" (Doyle, McCarver) - 4:02
"You Know Me" (Doyle, McCarver) - 4:19
"Stressin'" (D.J. Fingaz, McCarver) - 3:47
"When Yo Man Get Sleepy" (Doyle, J.R., McCarver) - 4:03
"What U Need" (Doyle, McCarver) - 4:12
"The Dog in Me" feat. Kurupt (Brown, Kante, McCarver) - 3:52
"Which One Is U?" (Keith, McCarver) - 4:49
"Nasty" feat. Grip (Doyle, Grip, McCarver) - 4:22
"Make Um Bounce" feat. Young Bleed - 3:54
"Broken Home" (J.R., Keith, McCarver)  – 4:39
"Listen to My 9" (Doyle, McCarver) - 4:25

Personnel 

Bosko – producer
Celly Cel – executive producer
WC – performer
Young Bleed – performer

Celly Cel albums
2000 albums
Albums produced by Bosko